Shiba Kumar Rai  is a Professor of medical microbiology and member of National Planning Commission (NPC) of the government of Nepal.  He is also founding chairman of Shi-Gan Health Foundation, Shi-Gan Int’l College of Science & Technology (SICOST), Nat’l Institute of Tropical Medicine & Public Health Research, DASHIMURA Foundation & DEVIS Multipurpose (P) Ltd.

He has been awarded “Mahendra Vidhya Bhshan ‘Ga’, ‘Kha’ & ‘Ka’ gold medals” (all three classes) by Government of Nepal (from then king of Nepal) for securing ‘first class first’ position in Bachelor & Master degrees & for doing PhD (in Medicine),  respectively.

Books/Chapter in books
Prof. Rai has authored/coauthored 25 health/medical science related books and/or chapters in books. They are:

1. Practical Hematology, TU Institute of Medicine 1979 (in Nepali)

2. Practical Biochemistry, TU Institute of Medicine 1979 (in Nepali)

3. Laboraratory Accidents, First Aids & Prevention, TU Institute of Medicine Family Health Project, 1983 (in Nepali)

4. Human Parasitology. Tribhuvan Univ Inst of Med Family Health Project / UNFPA, Kathmandu, Nepal 1985 (in Nepali).

5. Notes on Medical Microbiology; Leela & Munnu, Ktm, Nepal 1987.

6. (Editors: Nakanishi M, Shrestha HG & Rai SK): Text Book of Medical Laboratory Technology JICA Med Edu Project, Tribhuvan Univ Inst of Med, Ktm, Nepal, 1996.

7. Parasitology (Chapter-IX); In Text Book of Medical Laboratory Technology, Edit: Nakanishi M, Shrestha HG & Rai SK, JICA Med Edu Project, Tribhuvan Univ Inst of Med, Ktm, Nepal, 1996: 445~599.

8. Serology and Immunology (Chapter-X). In Text Book of Medical Laboratory Technology, Edit: Nakanishi M, Shrestha HG & Rai SK, JICA Med Edu Project, Tribhuvan Univ Inst of Med, Ktm, Nepal, 1996: 601~33.

9. Rai SK, Uga S, Kataoka N & Matsumura T:  Atlas of Medical Parasitology; Kobe Univ School of Med, Kobe, Japan 1996.

10. Matsumura T, Rahman MS, Rai SK, Saito A & Uga S:  In Biological Contamination of Environment and Its Control Measures: Present Situation of Sand Pit Contamination by Dogs and Cats in All About Antimicrobials; Edit: Yuge O, Yokoyama H & Sakagami Y; Sen-I Sha, Osaka, Japan 1997: 316~24 (Text in Japanese).

11. Rai SK (Editor): Manual of Basic Laboratory Techniques for Peripheral Health Care Centers in Developing Countries. Laligurans Kai, Japan, 2001.
Also contributed following Chapters in the manual:
• Rai SK, Rai G & Ishiyama S: Parasitology (Chapter-V); Page: 93~118 and 
• Rai SK, Rai G & Ono K: Semen Analysis (Chapter-VII); Page: 135~8.

12. Rai SK, Thapa M & Sharma BK. Practical Microbiology for Undergraduate Medical Students. SMB, Ktm, Nepal 2003.

13. Kurokawa M, Ono K & Rai SK. Viruses Causing Pediatric Diarrhea. In: Current Trends in Pediatrics Vol. 1 (Chapter 24); Edit: Mathur GP & Mathur S. Academa Publishers, Delhi, India 2005: 227~37.

14. Rai SK. Parasitic Diseases in Nepal. In: Asian Parasitology, Vol 1: Food-borne Helminthiasis in Asia; Editor-in-chief: Yano A; Vol Edit: Arizono N, Chai JY, Nawa Y & Takahashi Y. Federation of Asian Parasitologists, Japan 2005: 305~18.

15. Rai SK. Toxoplasma Infection in Nepal: An Overview. In: Asian Parasitology, Vol. 4: Toxoplasmosis and Babesiosis in Asia; Edit-in-chief: Yano A; Vol Edit: Yano A, Nam H-W, Anuar A K, Shen J, Saito A & Igarashi I. Federation of Asian Parasitologists, Japan 2005: 82~96.

16. Rai SK, Kurokawa M & Ono K. Viruses Causing Respiratory Infections in Children. In: Current Trends in Pediatrics Vol. 2 (Chapter 15); Edit: Mathur GP & Mathur S. Academa Publishers, Delhi, India 2006: 99~110.

17. Kurokawa M, Ono K & Rai SK. Congenital Infection. In: Current Trends in Pediatrics. Vol. 3; Edit: Mathur GP & Mathur S. Academa Publishers, Delhi, India 2007: 97~119.

18. Ohno Y, Hirai K, Rai SK, Sherchand JB & Shrestha M. Food consumption patterns, nutrient intake, and serum components among middle-aged and elderly Nepalese. In: Nutrition for the Middle Aged and Elderly. Edit: Bernhardt NE & Kasko AM. Nova Sci Publishers, Inc. New York, USA 2008: 11~29.

19. Kimura K, Rai SK & Ono K. Environmental Health. In: The Global Health in Developing Countries - The Health Care in Nepal. Edit: Ono K, Yufune S. Fukuro Suppan, Okayama, Japan 2009: 17~36 (Text in Japanese).

20. Rai SK: Nepalese Health System: Community-Based Health Workers (CBHWs) and Female Community Health Volunteers (FCHVs), Chapter-2 in Global Health in Asia; Edit: Uga S, Uesugi Y, Osawa K, Ono K, Kido Y, Shintani M, Tanaka K & Horie O; Kobe Univ Graduate School of Health Sci, Kobe, Japan 2012: 19~42.

21. Rai SK. Zoonotic Parasitic Diseases in Nepal. In Parasitic Zoonoses in Asian-Pacific Regions 2012; Edit:  Tokoro M & Uga S (First Edition); Sankeisha Co, Nagoya, Japan 2013: 10-5.

22. Gupta BP, Rai SK & Sherchand JB. Text Book of Medical Virology. Bhundipuran Prakashan, Ktm, Nepal Jan 2015.

23. Kurokawa M, Ono K & Rai SK. Viral Infections (Measles, Rubella, Varicella-Zoster, Roseaola, Epstein-Barr virus & Parvovirus B19) In: Text Book of Pediatrics. Edit: Mathur GP, Mathur S & Faridi MMA. CBS Publishers & Distributers Pvt. Ltd. (New Delhi, Benguluru, Chennai, Kochi, Mumbai, Pune), India; Feb. 2015: 367~375.

24. Rai SK. Changing Trends of Infectious Diseases in Nepal. In: Infectious Disease & Nanomedicine III. Edit: Adhikari R & Thapa S. Advances in Experimental Medicine & Biology. Vol. 1052, Springer, Singapore; May 2018: 19~38.

25. Amatya R & Rai SK. Biofilm Producing Microorganisms and Clinical Implications in the Context of Developing Countries. Chapter in: Emerging Concepts in Bacterial Biofilms: Molecular Mechanisms and Control Strategies. Edit. Thomas S et al, The Cambridge Scholars Publishing Ltd, England, UK, 2019 (Accepted for publication).

Research Papers
Until now, Prof. Rai has contributed 186 research papers in peer reviewed/indexed professional journals & appears in Google Scholar” (Shiba Kumar Rai, Nepal).

Prof. Rai has received “best research paper award” in 2007 (from Prime Minister of Nepal) & subsequently in 2011 (from President of Nepal). 

Recently (April 12, 2019) he has also been awarded “Health Research Lifetime Achievement Award-2018” by Nepal Health Research Council (Government of Nepal) considering his 179 research papers & 25 books and/or Chapters in books (till 2018) (highest number among Nepalese). Prof Rai is the first Nepali to be awarded this award.

Social Works
He founded Hattigaunda Welfare Society (Sewa Samaj) in 1997 and established sisterly relationship with Doshou Kai (Alumni Association) and Extension Center of Kobe Tokiwa College in Kobe, Japan. Under this relationship, students and faculty exchange is being done on every alternate year since start of relationship in 1997. For the purpose of health research, he has also founded Nat'l Institute of Tropical Medicine and Public Health Research (NITMPHR). Dashimura Foundation is new social organization he has founded which is currently working on the establishment of a "senior citizen care home" together with other social works focused on quality education (by establishing the prizes/awards to be given to best performing students). He is also involved in Lions Club International.

References

1953 births
Living people
Nepalese scientists
Rai people
People from Bhojpur District, Nepal